Shiv Bhakta also spelt as Shiv-Bhakta is a 1955 Hindu epic film directed by H.L.N. Simha starring Shahu Modak and Padmini in lead roles. It was a mythological film produced by AVM productions and it was directed by H. L. N. Simha with music by Chitrgupta. The songs were penned by Gopal Singh Nepali. Songs were considered evergreen. There are excellent classical dances by Padmini in this film. This was Padmini's second Hindi film followed by Mr. Sampat (1952). The film is a remake of director - producer duo's 1954 Kannada film Bedara Kannappa.

Cast 
Shahu Modak as Deena
Padmini as Rani
Ragini as Chintamani 
Pandari Bai as Neela
Mishra as Kailashnath Shastri
Anant Kumar as Kashinath Shastri
Kumari Devi as Gauri Shastri
Sope as Young Neela
Rushyendramani as Rani's mother
Ramachandra Sastry as Lord Shiva
Deshraj as Young Deena

Songs 
The music was composed by Chitragupt and the lyrics were written by Gopal Singh Nepali.

References

External links 
 

1955 films
1950s Hindi-language films
Indian black-and-white films
Hindu mythological films
Hindi remakes of Kannada films
AVM Productions films
Films directed by H. L. N. Simha
Indian drama films
1955 drama films